Jekselen Peak is, at , the highest peak in a small ridge  east-southeast of Mount Schumacher, in the Ahlmann Ridge of Queen Maud Land, Antarctica. It was mapped by Norwegian cartographers from surveys and air photos by the Norwegian–British–Swedish Antarctic Expedition (1949–52) and from air photos by the Norwegian expedition (1958–59) and named Jekselen (the molar).

References

External links

Mountains of Queen Maud Land
Princess Martha Coast